Arcachon – La Teste-de-Buch Airport  is an airport located 4.5 km southeast of Arcachon and near La Teste-de-Buch, both communes of the Gironde département in France.

References 

Airports in Nouvelle-Aquitaine